In Exile is the debut solo album by Irish-American singer-songwriter Michael Patrick Kelly. It was released by Polydor Records on March 27, 2003, in German-speaking Europe. Recorded between the production of The Kelly Family albums La Patata (2002) and Homerun (2004), In Exile marked his first full-length effort as a solo artist. A moderate commercial success, it peaked at number 13 on the German Albums Chart. The album was issued under his popular band name, Paddy Kelly. Subsequent releases would be produced under his birth name.

Track listing
All songs written and produced by Kelly, featuring co-production from Fabio Trentini, and Marco Minnemann.

Charts

References

External links 
 

Michael Patrick Kelly albums
2003 debut albums
Polydor Records albums